The 2021–22 Valparaiso Beacons men's basketball team represented Valparaiso University during the 2021–22 NCAA Division I men's basketball season. The Beacons, led by sixth-year head coach Matt Lottich, played their home games at the Athletics–Recreation Center as members of the Missouri Valley Conference.

Formerly nicknamed the Crusaders, the university dropped that name and associated mascot and logos in 2021 because of the "negative connotation and violence associated with the Crusader imagery," and because of its use by certain hate groups. The school announced on August 10, 2021, that its athletic teams would officially be known as Beacons effective immediately.

Previous season
In a season limited due to the ongoing COVID-19 pandemic, Valparaiso finished the 2020–21 season 10–18, 7–11 in MVC play to finish a three-way tie for fifth place. As the No. 6 seed in the MVC tournament, they lost to Missouri State in the quarterfinals.

Offseason

Departures

Incoming transfers

2021 recruiting class

Roster

Schedule and results

|-
!colspan=9 style=|Exhibition
|-

|-

|-
!colspan=9 style=| Regular season
|-

|-
!colspan=12 style=| MVC tournament

Source

References

Valparaiso
Valparaiso Beacons men's basketball seasons
Valparaiso Beacons men's basketball
Valparaiso Beacons men's basketball